The Baze Senior Knockout Teams national bridge championship was held at the fall American Contract Bridge League (ACBL) North American Bridge Championship (NABC).

The Senior Knockout Teams was a knock-out team event.
The event typically started on the first Sunday of the NABC.
The event was restricted to Seniors – players 55 years of age or older.

History
The event was introduced in 1994. It was renamed in 2010 in honor of Grant Baze and is contested for the Baze Trophy. It was dropped from the ACBL schedule effective January 1, 2019.

Winners

References

Sources

 List of previous winners, Page 6. 

 2008 winners, Page 1. 

 "Search Results: Baze Senior Knockout Teams". ACBL. Visit "NABC Winners"; select a Fall NABC. Retrieved 2014-06-06.

External links
 "Senior KO Teams – A Look Back". November 26, 2013. ACBL. Retrieved 2014-06-06.
 ACBL Database - Senior KO Teams

North American Bridge Championships